Adolfo António da Luz Calisto (born 1 January 1944), simply known as Adolfo, is a retired Portuguese footballer who played left back and was one of the top players for Benfica and the Portugal national team during the 1960s and 1970s.

Career
Born in Barreiro, Portugal, he first attracted attention for his local team of FC Barreirense, (1960–1962 and 1963–1966), and for Seixal (1962–1963). After that he moved to Benfica, where he played from 1965/66 to 1974/75. He then played for U.Montemor (1975–1976) and Portimonense (1976–1977), before ending his career at age 33. He won six championships, and was part of the Benfica squad that reached the Champions Cup Final in 1968. As a Benfica player he achieved the nickname of "Barreiro locomotiv", he was the first wing defender doing the entire corridor.

He had 15 caps for the national team, scoring 1 goals, and played with the team that reached 2nd place at the 1972 Independence Brazil Cup final, losing only in an epic final with Brazil (1-0), being considered the best wing left defender that year.

The Portuguese team, which was largely composed of Benfica players, including veterans Eusébio and Jaime Graça, and youngsters Humberto Coelho and Jordão, lost the final only at the 89th minute, when Jairzinho finally scored.

|}

Honours
Benfica
Primeira Divisão: 1967–68, 1968–69, 1970–71, 1971–72, 1972–73, 1974–75
Taça de Portugal: 1968–69, 1969–70, 1971–72
European Cup: Runner-up 1967–68

References

Further reading

External links
 
 

1944 births
Living people
Sportspeople from Barreiro, Portugal
Association football defenders
Portuguese footballers
Portugal international footballers
F.C. Barreirense players
S.L. Benfica footballers
União Montemor players
Portimonense S.C. players
Portuguese football managers